Red White & Blue is a 2010 revenge-thriller film written and directed by Simon Rumley.

Plot summary
Erica spends her nights trawling the bars and beds of Austin, Texas. Emotionally withdrawn, her only form of human contact is a series of one-night stands. She lives in a flophouse where she does the cleaning in exchange for room and board. This arrangement with the landlady is discontinued when new boarder Nate moves in, and Erica finds herself in urgent need of a regular income to pay for her stay. Feeling responsible, Nate helps her land a job in the DIY store where he works. Distrustful and reluctant at first, she gradually warms up to the mysterious Nate, who uses an anecdote from his childhood as a metaphor to justify his protective demeanor towards Erica despite his psychopathic tendencies. He also claims to have been honorably discharged from service in Iraq and is apparently considering a job offer by the CIA. Despite his air of danger and Erica's difficulty in leaving her promiscuity behind, the two form a hesitant bond.

Franki Morrison, a young, hot-headed wannabe rock star, learns on the eve of his band's departure for a European tour that he is HIV-positive. This affects his mother as well, since he had spent months donating blood to her for her cancer treatment. Distraught by the news and its implications, Franki realizes he must have been infected by Erica, the only woman he had unprotected sex with during the past six months. His two bandmates had also partaken in the foursome (shown in the film's initial scenes) but test negative. However, their loyalty and that of another friend named Ed leads them to assist Franki in tracking Erica down and forcefully taking her to his home. Erica tacitly admits that she was deliberately exposing sexual partners to HIV but justifies her actions as a response to the rape she suffered as a child by her mother's boyfriend.

Franki's friends reluctantly leave him alone with Erica. Franki then rapes her, makes an awkward marriage proposal based on a warped attempt to rationalize their shared predicament, and keeps her hostage over the next few days. When he learns his mother committed suicide because of her exposure to HIV, Franki stabs Erica in a fit of rage. He and his three friends try to drive her to the hospital, but she dies in their car before they can take off. Her body is dismembered offscreen and, once again out of loyalty, Franki's friends agree to dispose of the parts in separate locations.

Before they can do so, Nate uses his CIA contact to track them down. He tortures and murders all of them, including Ed and his family, revealing himself to be a skilled and sadistic army interrogator. His last victim is Franki, whom he skins alive after retrieving Erica's head. He finally decides to turn down his CIA contact's offer for a job and moves to his sister's place in Tallahassee. Somewhere along his drive to Florida, he buries all of Erica's remains and burns every reminder of her, including a picture of their wedding some time earlier.

Cast

 Noah Taylor as Nate
 Amanda Fuller as Erica
 Marc Senter as Franki
 Nick Ashy Holden as Alvin
 Patrick Crovo	as Carl
 Jon Michael Davis as Ed
 Saxon Sharbino as Ed's Daughter
 Mark Hanson as Druggie Rock Guy
 Robert Sliger	as Oncologist
 Emily Cropper	as HIV Clinician

Production
Resident Evil: Apocalypse star Robert Hall worked on the film as Editor. The film was shot in Austin, Texas in the Alamo Drafthouse – 1120 South Lamar Boulevard, Beauty Bar – 617 East 7th Street and The Highball – 1142 South Lamar Boulevard, New Guild Co-Op - 510 West 23rd St. Noah Taylor, Amanda Fuller and Marc Senter played the leads in the Rumleyvision project.

Release
Red White & Blue premiered on January 29, 2010 as part of the International Film Festival Rotterdam. It was featured in several American film festivals: On March 16, 2010, it appeared in the South by Southwest; On March 27, 2010, it appeared in the Boston Underground Film Festival and on July 17, 2010, it appeared in the Danger After Dark Film Festival. The film will run on the Fantasia 2010.

Awards
The film won the Best of Fest Narrative Award at the 2010 Boston Underground Film Festival.

Soundtrack
Pop artist and producer Richard Chester composed the official score.

References

External links
 
 
 
 
 

2010 films
2010 horror films
2010 black comedy films
2010 comedy-drama films
2010s erotic thriller films
2010 independent films
2010s mystery thriller films
2010 psychological thriller films
American black comedy films
American comedy-drama films
American comedy horror films
American horror drama films
American horror thriller films
American independent films
American mystery thriller films
American satirical films
American erotic thriller films
American erotic horror films
American mystery horror films
Films set in Austin, Texas
Films shot in Austin, Texas
American rape and revenge films
American psychological thriller films
American psychological horror films
Psychological drama films
2010s English-language films
2010s American films